2W or 2-W may refer to,

2nd meridian west, a longitude coordinate
OR 2W; see U.S. Route 30 in Oregon
SD40-2W, a model of EMD SD40-2 locomotive
GP38-2W, a model of EMD GP38-2 locomotive
GP40-2W, a model of EMD GP40-2 locomotive
AF-2W, a model of Grumman AF Guardian
SLC-2W, a designation for Vandenberg AFB Space Launch Complex 2
Welcome Air's IATA code
BBC 2W
A two-wire telecommunications circuit
Tropical Depression 02W; see Typhoon Isa (1997)

See also
W2 (disambiguation)